Chromosome 1 open reading frame 162 is a protein that in humans is encoded by the C1orf162 gene. It has been found to be hypomethylated in instances of gastric cancer.

Gene 
The gene is located at p13.2 on chromosome 1 in humans and contains 8 exons. It is 11,026 bases long and is oriented on the plus strand.

mRNA 
Three transcript variants have been identified. Isoform 1 is the longest transcript and encodes the longest isoform. Isoform 2 uses an alternate in-frame splice site and is shorter than isoform 1. Isoform 3 lacks an alternate in-frame exon and is shorter compared to isoform 1.
There are six stem loops in the 5' untranslated region and five stem loops in the 3' untranslated region.

Protein
The predicted molecular weight of the protein C1orf162 is 16.9 kdal. Its isoelectric point is approximately 9.2 in mammals. A single transmembrane region is conserved across species. The protein is predicted to localize mainly in the nucleus. The protein is predicted to be myristoylated.

Expression
C1orf162 is not ubiquitously expressed in humans. According to microarray-assessed tissue expression patterns, C1orf162 is most highly expressed in bone marrow, lung, fetal liver, lymph node, spleen, and thymus in normal human tissues.  Staining of normal tissues has found high levels of RNA expression in bone marrow, lymph node, spleen, and lung tissue, which coincides with microarray-assessed expression patterns.

Clinical Significance
One study found the protein to be one of three hypomethylated proteins in instances of gastric cancer.

Homology 

The gene has no known paralogs. Orthologs have been noted in many mammal species in addition to a few birds and reptiles. The transmembrane region of the protein is highly conserved across species. No orthologs have been identified in fish, insects, or prokaryotes.

References

Further reading